The 2010 Victorian state election, held on Saturday, 27 November 2010, was for the 57th Parliament of Victoria. The election was to elect all 88 members of the Legislative Assembly and all 40 members of the Legislative Council. The incumbent centre-left Labor Party government, led by John Brumby, was defeated by the centre-right Liberal/National Coalition opposition, led by Ted Baillieu. The election gave the Coalition a one-seat majority in both houses of parliament.

Voting is compulsory in Victoria. Elections for the Legislative Assembly use instant-runoff voting (called preferential voting in Australia) in single-member electorates (called districts). Elections for the Legislative Council use partial proportional representation, using single transferable vote (also called preferential voting) in multi-member electorates (called regions). Members of the Legislative Council are elected from eight electoral regions each returning five members, making the quota for election in each region 16.67 percent of valid votes cast in that region. The election was conducted by the Victorian Electoral Commission (VEC).

Background

At the 1999 election, the Labor Party led by Steve Bracks was able to form a minority government with the parliamentary support of 3 Independents, displacing the incumbent Jeff Kennett Liberal/National Coalition government. Labor was returned with a majority government after a landslide win at the 2002 election. Labor was elected for a third term at the 2006 election with a substantial but reduced majority. Labor won 55 of the 88 seats, a decrease of 7, and 54.4% of the two-party preferred vote, a decrease of 3.4%. Brumby replaced Bracks as Labor leader and Premier of Victoria in 2007.

Political changes
The previous elections took place on Saturday, 25 November 2006. At the 2006 election, the Labor Party won 55 of the 88 seats, the Liberal Party won 23, the National Party won 9, and there was 1 Independent. Since that date a number of political changes took place.

Both Premier Bracks and Deputy Premier John Thwaites resigned on 27 July 2007.

By-elections
Between the 2006 and 2010 elections, four by-elections took place. In Bracks' seat of Williamstown and Thwaites' seat of Albert Park in 2007, former minister Andre Haermeyer's seat of Kororoit in 2008, and former minister Lynne Kosky's seat of Altona in 2010. All four seats were retained by Labor. Labor MP Craig Langdon resigned from his seat of Ivanhoe in August 2010, however the by-election writ was discharged by the Parliamentary Speaker due to the proximity of the state election coupled with the cost of holding a by-election.

Campaign

The Liberal and National Parties contested the election as a Coalition, which they had not done since the previous agreement lapsed in 2000. The Liberal Party departed from tradition and gave their preferences to Labor ahead of the Greens, thereby decreasing the chances of the Greens winning up to four inner city seats from Labor.

The Coalition launched their campaign on 14 November 2010 at the Melbourne Convention and Exhibition Centre in the electoral district of Melbourne, with the slogan: "Fix the problems. Build the future." Labor launched their campaign on 16 November 2010 in the electoral district of Bendigo East, using the slogan: "For the times ahead." The Greens ran with the slogan "This time, I'm voting Green".

Issues
The Coalition campaigned heavily against the Brumby Government's new Myki ticketing system, which had been delivered at triple the projected cost and years behind schedule, as well as its construction of an expensive desalination plant that many claimed was unnecessary. Other issues included health, education, and law and order. Ted Baillieu promised to restore the budget to surplus, employ more nurses and police, make Victorian teachers the highest paid in the country, and abolish suspended sentences which were seen as out of touch with community standards.

Retiring MPs

Labor
 Peter Batchelor MLA (Thomastown)
 Bob Cameron MLA (Bendigo West)
 Carlo Carli MLA (Brunswick)
 Judy Maddigan MLA (Essendon)
 Karen Overington MLA (Ballarat West)
 George Seitz MLA (Keilor)

Liberal
 Helen Shardey MLA (Caulfield)
 John Vogels MLC (Western Victoria Region)

National
 Ken Jasper MLA (Murray Valley)

Results

Legislative Assembly

|}
Labor suffered a swing of 5.96 percent, a larger swing than the 1992 landslide that brought the Jeff Kennett-led Coalition to power. However, much of that swing was wasted on landslide victories in the Coalition's heartland. As a result, the Coalition only just managed the 13-seat swing it needed to make Baillieu premier, netting it a bare majority of two seats.

On 29 November, with the result beyond doubt, Brumby conceded defeat. He resigned as state Labor leader the next day. The new Liberal/National government was sworn in on 2 December 2010, and former Health Minister Daniel Andrews was elected Labor leader on 3 December.

Legislative Council

|}

Legislative Council seats

In the 40-member upper house where all members are up for re-election every term, the Coalition won a majority of 21 seats, with 16 seats won by Labor and 3 won by the Greens.

Seats changing hands

¶ In 2006, the final Gippsland East 2PP count included Independent and Liberal, however in 2010 the final 2PP count included Independent and Nationals

Key dates
Terms are fixed at four years. Elections occur in line with the fixed term provisions laid out in the Electoral Act 2002.

Key dates for the election were:

2 November: Dissolution of Parliament and lodgement of election writs
9 November: Close of rolls
11 November: Close of nominations for party candidates
12 November: Close of nominations for independents
15 November: Early voting commences
25 November: Close of postal voting
26 November: Early voting closes
27 November: Election day (polls open 8am to 6pm)

Polling
Polling conducted by Newspoll and published in The Australian is performed via random telephone number selection in city and country areas. Sampling sizes usually consist of over 1000 electors, with the declared margin of error at ±3 percent.

Sky News exit polls in marginal seats recorded a Coalition 54-46 Labor result.

Newspaper endorsements

References 

Elections in Victoria (Australia)
2010 elections in Australia
2010s in Victoria (Australia)
November 2010 events in Australia